Mighty may refer to:

Businesses
Mighty Audio, an American company known for its product Mighty, a portable audio player
Mighty Animation, an animation studio based in Guadalajara, Mexico

Films
The Mighty, a 1998 comedy–drama
The Mighty (1929 film), a 1929 action movie

Music
Mighty (The Planet Smashers album)
Mighty (Kristene DiMarco album)
 "Mighty" (featuring JFTH), a song by Caravan Palace from <|°_°|>

Other uses in arts and entertainment
The Mighty (comics), a DC Comics title
The Mighty (professional wrestling), an Australian WWE tag team
Mighty the Armadillo, a character in the Sonic the Hedgehog game series
Samira Mighty (born 1996), an English television personality and actress

See also
Might (disambiguation)
Mighty Atom (disambiguation)
Almighty (disambiguation)